Just Wright is a 2010 American romantic comedy film directed by Sanaa Hamri, starring Queen Latifah and Common. The film tells the story of a physical therapist, Leslie Wright, who falls in love with a professional basketball player, Scott McKnight.
It received mixed reviews from critics.

Plot
Leslie Wright, a physical therapist and die-hard basketball fan, is searching for a boyfriend but keeps being told by men that they see her only as a friend. After buying a house, Leslie allows her good friend and god-sister, Morgan, to stay at her home. The flighty and irresponsible Morgan dreams of becoming an NBA trophy wife.

Following a New Jersey Nets basketball game, Leslie helps star player Scott McKnight at a gas station. They share a friendly conversation about basketball and jazz, and Scott invites Leslie to his birthday party. Leslie attends the party but also brings Morgan who quickly sets her sights on Scott. Intent on getting his interest, Morgan pretends to volunteer at a homeless shelter and claims to have no interest in Scott at all. He is intrigued and tracks her down. After dating for three months, he proposes and, while Leslie expresses some skepticism about the relationship, she is ultimately pleased that Morgan is happy.

At the 2009 NBA All-Star Game, Scott suffers a torn PCL injury that puts his entire career in jeopardy. Morgan becomes suspicious of Scott's physical therapist, a beautiful blonde woman, and begs Leslie to take over as his live-in physical therapist. However, tensions arise as Morgan is now forced to spend more time with Scott and finds herself disliking him. As rumors circle that Scott's career could quickly end if he doesn't recover by the playoffs, Morgan decides to leave Scott by leaving him a letter.

Despite the awkward breakup, Leslie continues to work with Scott. She encourages and helps him with his recovery and helps to build his confidence. They also bond over their mutual love of basketball and music. Scott expresses surprise that Leslie is not seeing anyone and begins to see her in a more romantic light and she discovers that he plays piano, a talent he confides is his secret hobby.

Scott is able to return to the NBA just before the playoffs and wins his first game back after a pep-talk from Leslie. As a thank you, he presents her with her grandfather's classic Mustang which he has had remodelled and restored, but also paid extra to leave a dent in the side door intact as Leslie says it reminds her of her grandfather. After taking her to dinner, They first share a kiss, and then spend the night together.

The next morning, Morgan arrives at Scott's door hoping to reconcile, saying that she has been in therapy to work on the abandonment issues which led her to leave Scott in the first place. Broken-hearted, Leslie believes she has no chance against Morgan and decides to leave. Scott, who feels he owes it to Morgan to try to work things out, reluctantly lets Leslie go.

However, tensions quickly arise between Morgan and Scott as she continues planning their wedding while he wants to take things slow. Meanwhile, Leslie is surprised to discover she's being headhunted by many basketball teams impressed by her notable work helping Scott's recovery from his injury. Excited to get an offer from the Nets, Leslie realizes she would have to work with Scott and reluctantly turns the offer down. She then decides to interview with teams far from where she lives to put some distance between Scott, Morgan, and herself.

During a televised interview, Scott credits Leslie with his recovery. After praising her, he comes to the realization that he loves her. Morgan, who has been watching the interview, also realizes Scott's feelings and urges him to reunite with Leslie.

Chasing Leslie to a job interview in Philadelphia, Scott tells her that he loves her and urges her to reconcile with him despite the anger she might feel. In response, Leslie places a phone call to the Nets and accepts a position with them.

A year later, Leslie and Morgan are watching Scott play. Leslie is now one of the Nets' athletic trainers and cheers loudly for Scott, who is at last revealed to be her husband.

Cast
Queen Latifah as Leslie Wright
Common as Scott McKnight
Paula Patton as Morgan Alexander
James Pickens Jr. as Lloyd Wright
Pam Grier as Janice Wright
Phylicia Rashad as Ella McKnight
Laz Alonso as Mark Matthews
Mehcad Brooks as Angelo Bembrey
Michael Landes as Nelson Kaspian
Leo Allen as Paul
Dwight Howard as himself
Dwyane Wade as himself
Rashard Lewis as himself
Bobby Simmons as himself
Jalen Rose as himself
Rajon Rondo as himself
Chris Paul as himself
Doris Burke as herself
John Legend as himself
Elton Brand as himself

Production
Part of the film was shot at Regis High School in New York City. It was also filmed at Meadowlands Arena (named Izod Center at the time).

Reception
Just Wright received mixed reviews from movie critics. The film's rating on Rotten Tomatoes was 46% as of December 2020. The critical consensus reads: "Well-intentioned but formulaic, Just Wright has winning leads but can't overcome its preponderance of cliches." Conversely, Roger Ebert gave the film 3 stars out of 4.

The film debuted at number four behind Iron Man 2, Robin Hood and Letters to Juliet with $8,284,989 million on its opening weekend. Just Wright grossed $21,540,363 million domestically and  $29,900 globally to a total of  $21,570,263 million worldwide. The film stayed in theaters 47 days, the equivalent of 6.7 weeks.

Awards

See also
 List of black films of the 2010s

References

External links
 
 
 
 
 

2010 films
2010 romantic comedy films
2010s sports comedy films
African-American comedy films
American basketball films
American romantic comedy films
American sports comedy films
Dune Entertainment films
Fox Searchlight Pictures films
2010s English-language films
Films directed by Sanaa Hamri
Films set in New Jersey
Films set in Philadelphia
Films shot in New Jersey
Films shot in New York City
African-American romance films
2010s American films
Films about National Basketball Association